This is a list of the schools in Division II of the National Collegiate Athletic Association (NCAA) in the United States and Canada that have men's soccer as a varsity sport. In the 2022 season, there are a total of 202 men's Division II soccer programs. Conference affiliations are current for the coming 2023 season.

NCAA Division II men's soccer programs
Reclassifying institutions in yellow. Institution that has announced a future departure from Division II in pink.

Future Division II men's soccer programs

See also

List of NCAA Division II institutions
List of NCAA Division II football programs
List of NCAA Division II lacrosse programs
List of NCAA Division II wrestling programs
List of NCAA Division I men's soccer programs
List of NCAA Division II women's soccer programs

References

External links

NCAA Division II Men's Soccer Sponsorship
NCAA Division II Men's Soccer Home

Soccer
United States
NCAA Division II men's soccer
Soccer